Eurydoxa rhodopa is a species of moth of the family Tortricidae. It is found in China.

The wingspan is about 29 mm. The forewings are blackish brown, covered with small round dots and ochreous-whitish oblique transverse streaks along the costa. The hindwings are dark bronze brown.

References

Moths described in 1950
Ceracini